Molloy or O'Molloy is an Irish surname, anglicised from Ó Maolmhuaidh, maolmhuadh meaning 'Proud Chieftain'. (See also Malloy.) They were part of the southern Uí Néill, the southern branch of the large tribal grouping claiming descent from Niall of the Nine Hostages, the fifth-century king who supposedly kidnapped St Patrick to Ireland. They held power over a large part of what is now Co Offaly, where the surname is still very common. A second family were the O Maoil Aodha, 'descendant of the devotee of (St) Aodh', from maol, literally 'bald', a reference to the distinctive tonsure sported by early Irish monks. As well as Molloy, this surname has also been anglicised as Mulloy, Malloy, Maloy, 'Miley' and 'Millea'. The name arose in east Connacht, in the Roscommon/east Galway region, and remains numerous there today.

Notable people with the surname include: 
 Albin O'Molloy (died 1223), one of the bishops who officiated at the coronation of King Richard the Lionheart in England in 1189
 Annie E. Molloy (1871–1928), American suffragist, labor leader
 Anthony Molloy (disambiguation), several people
 Bill Molloy (1929–2020), English footballer
 Bobby Molloy, Irish politician
 Charles Molloy (journalist) (died 1767), Irish journalist, political activist and minor playwright
 Charles Molloy (lawyer) (1640–1690), Irish lawyer known as a writer on maritime law
 Donald W. Molloy, American judge
 Francie Molloy, Irish politician
 Georgiana Molloy, early settler and botanical collector in Western Australia
 Gerald Molloy, Irish theologian and scientist
 Irene Molloy, American actress, singer and songwriter of Irish descent
 James Lynam Molloy (1837–1909), Irish composer and writer
 Joanna Molloy, American gossip columnist
 John Molloy, early settler in Western Australia
 Leo Molloy, New Zealand businessman
 Leonard Greenham Star Molloy, British Member of Parliament
 Margaret Molloy, Irish businesswoman
 Matt Molloy, Irish musician
 Mick Molloy, Australian comedian, co-host of the Martin/Molloy radio program
 Mike Molloy, British journalist, newspaper editor, artist and author
 Myra Molloy, Thai singer
 Father Niall Molloy, a priest who died in mysterious circumstances in 1985
 Seaneen Molloy, Northern Irish blogger and writer 
 Sylvia Molloy, Argentine academic and writer
 Sylvia Clark Molloy, British artist
 Terry Molloy (born 1947), British actor
 Thomas Molloy, Australian politician
 Thomas B. Molloy, Canadian politician
 Thomas Edmund Molloy, American Bishop of Brooklyn 1921–1956
 W. Thomas Molloy, Canadian lawyer and land claim negotiator
 William Molloy (disambiguation)

See also 
 Mulloy Brothers, Irish balladeer group

Surnames of Irish origin
Irish families